Emmanuel College is a Catholic, co-educational, secondary college in Warrnambool, Victoria, Australia. The college is situated on three campuses in Warrnambool, located at the end of the Great Ocean Road in Victoria's Western District. The college is co-sponsored by the Sisters of Mercy  who  established  St  Ann's  College  in 1872  and  the Congregation of Christian Brothers who  founded  St  Joseph's  Christian  Brothers' College in 1902. Emmanuel College was the  result of  an amalgamation  of the  two  colleges in 1991.

Geography 

Emmanuel College is located in Warrnambool, 250 kilometres west of Melbourne on the Southern Ocean. There is a senior (Rice) campus nearby, in Canterbury Road which caters for Year 11 and 12 VCE, VET and VCAL Students. Another campus next to the McAuley Campus, houses year 9 students. In the future the building masterplan will see Years 10 to 12 situated in Ardlie Street, Years 7 and 8 in Hopetoun Road and Year 9 in Canterbury Road.

History

St Ann's College
The Sisters of Mercy had purchased the property "Wyton House" and  established their  convent and  "A Day and Boarding School for Young Ladies" by July 1872 on the present site of the Ardlie Street Campus. The dedication  of  their  chapel   in  1888 resulted in the  school's name  becoming  St Ann's College. The college was offering to prepare students for matriculation by the late 19th century. The  college's junior school (kindergarten to grade 6)  had been phased out by 1975 and its boarding  school  had  closed by 1978. From this point until its amalgamation in 1991, St Ann's was  a day  school,  providing its  girls   with a years 7-12 curriculum.

St Joseph's Christian Brothers' College
The Christian Brothers opened a private  day school for boys in 1902 on the corner of Jamieson Street and Banyon Street, Russells Creek, Warrnambool. 16  boys enrolled,  "ranging from grade 3" - the level at which its junior school commenced - and  up  "to matriculation" (year 12).  The  school was  known  as both 'St Mary's High School' and  'The  Monastery' in its  early  years.  In   1911, the purchase of the Canterbury Road grounds, previously the Hohenlohe Girl's College, saw the establishment of  St Joseph's Christian Brothers' College. For  many decades the school maintained its primary school, enrolling boys  at grade 3. By 1987 "the long tradition of combined primary and secondary education" had drawn to a  close and  the college provided its boys with a years 7-12  curriculum.

The two  schools  amalgamated  in 1991 to become the co-educational Emmanuel College.

House system
Each house is named after a significant person in the college's history. Sporting competitions are held between them each year.

Curriculum 

Emmanuel has a wide range of curriculum choices. Its special features are the Five Star Program for Year 7, the FLY program for Years 8 to 10 and a full range of options for senior students, including VCE, VET, VCAL and Australian School Based Apprenticeships. The F.L.Y. (Flexible Learning Years) program provides for students to be able to work at levels appropriate to their ability, rather than the traditional approach of being locked into units bound by their year level or age. Emmanuel College students can also gain nationally accredited qualifications in Agriculture whilst still at school.

Co-curricular activities 

These include: Music activities (now removed) and performances; Public speaking and Debating; Mooting; Duke of Edinburgh's Award; Science Talent Search and other academic competitions; Eisteddfods; Drama Productions; a variety of team sports; Rowing; Equestrian Team; Agricultural Shows; Emmanuel's Interactive Animal Nursery at the Fun4Kids Festival and Field Days; Chess, Book Club, optional camps and trips including study tours to France, Japan, New Caledonia, Switzerland and the Rock To Reef tours.

Sports 

Emmanuel College has created to the development of a number of students who have represented their state and country at world championships and the Commonwealth, Olympic and Paralympic Games. The college provides a wide range of sporting options and opportunities to compete in interschool carnivals.

Alumni 

Sport 
Jonathan Brown, former Australian Rules Football player, Captain of the Brisbane Lions, Coleman Medalist and 3 time premiership player
Jordan Lewis, Australian Rules Football player and four time premiership player 
Michael Turner, Australian Rules Football 
Martin Gleeson, Australian Rules Football
Louis Herbert, former Australian Rules Football player
Simon Hogan, former Australian Rules Football player
Shaun Ryan, Australian Rules Football Umpire and barrister 
Michelle Ferris, Australian olympic cyclist 
Trevor Gleeson, NBL Coach and Assistant Australian Basketball Coach 
Nathan Sobey, national Basketball League player with the Adelaide 36ers and Greek Basketball League PAOK, Commonwealth Games Gold Medalist
Kevin Neale, former Australian Rules Football player
Adrian Gleeson, former Australian Rules Football player and Carlton Football Club Board Member
Brody Couch, Victoria and Melbourne Stars cricket player

Politics and service
Joseph Basil Roper, Bishop of Toowoomba 
 David  Atkinson  OAM former Mayor of  Warrnambool
Danielle Green Member of the Victorian Legislative Assembly for Yan Yean, Member of the Andrews Ministry
Beth Gleeson Member of the Victorian Legislative Assembly for Thomastown
Roma Britnell Member of the Victorian Legislative Assembly for South-West Coast
John McGrath Member of the Victorian Legislative Assembly for Warrnambool (1985 -1999)
Lady Lynch (née Leah O'Toole) charity worker

Media and the arts 
Gorgi Coghlan Australian television presenter 
Dave Hughes Australian television presenter and comedian 
Shane Howard Australian singer songwriter
Peggy O'Keefe pianist, bandleader and television & radio presenter
Nathan Sobey basketballer
Lisa Gorman fashion designer

Sister schools 

Obirin High School, Tokyo, Japan (Formerly 臆病者学校)
Edmund Rice School, Tanzania 
Etablissement Secondaire de Morges-Beausobre, Switzerland 
Previously Mackillop College, Swan Hill, Victoria, Australia

References

External links
Emmanuel College Homepage
Emmanuel Alumni Website

Catholic secondary schools in Victoria (Australia)
Congregation of Christian Brothers secondary schools in Australia
Sisters of Mercy schools
Education in Warrnambool
Private schools in Victoria (Australia)
1872 establishments in Australia
Educational institutions established in 1872